The French rugby league system is a four tiered structure with the major national club competition being the Elite One Championship. Below this is the Elite Two Championship and a number of regional leagues. The teams in each competition can change each year depending on final standings and relegation/promotion.

There is no set structure for promotion and relegation. If a club wants to go up or down a level then they will consult the Fédération Française de Rugby à XIII who will make the decision.

French clubs can also apply to the Rugby Football League to compete in any level of the British rugby league system.

Elite One Championship 
The Elite One Championship currently has nine teams competing in the competition. It is the top tier of rugby league in France and sees teams relegated to and promoted from the Elite Two Championship.

Elite Two Championship
The Elite Two Championship is the second tier of rugby league in France. Winning teams are promoted to the Elite One Championship, providing they meet stadium/financial requirements. Team's finishing bottom can be relegated to the National Division East or West. There are currently eight teams in the division.

The league was created in 2007 to replace National League One as the second tier. This was intended to bridge the gap between the top division and the rest of the clubs in the league system.

National Division 1 
The National Division is the third tier of French rugby league. It is normally divided into two equal divisions East and West. However, in 2008 it was a single pool of 11 teams. It currently has 12 teams.

National Division 2 
The National Division 2 is currently split into three zones, with 22 clubs competing across the zones.

Pyramid

French teams to play in the British RFL
 Catalans Dragons: Super League (2006–present)
 Toulouse Olympique: Super League (2022), Championship (2009–2011; 2017–2021; 2023–present), League 1 (2016)
 PSG: Super League (1996–1997) defunct

Super League

As of 2022 France has two teams competing on the British Super League – Catalans Dragons and Toulouse Olympique. There is no automatic promotion and relegation between Super League and French domestic leagues, and Transitions between the leagues is done by Application to the Rugby Football League. Catalans Dragons have been a Super League team since their application was approved ahead of the 2006 season, whereas Toulouse will play from the 2022 season after gaining promotion from the lower British divisions. PSG also competed in Super League for two seasons between 1996 and 1997.

Championship
Toulouse Olympique are the only French team to have played in the Championship, playing two seasons in 2009 and 2010, before rejoining the French league system. They spent a further five years between 2017 and 2021, after reapplication to the British rugby league system saw them enter at League 1. They spent one year in the British third division, and were promoted to the Super League following winning the 2021 Million Pound Game. They were relegated in 2022.

League 1
Toulouse Olympique are the only French team to have competed in League 1, having done so in 2016.

See also

Rugby league in France
Australian rugby league system
British rugby league system
France national rugby league team
France women's national rugby league team
French Rugby League Championship
Elite One Championship
Elite Two Championship
National Division 1
National Division 2
Lord Derby Cup
Coupe Falcou
Paul Dejean Cup

Notes

References

External links
Google map - Elite One Championship teams
Google map - Elite Two Championship teams
Google map - National Division East teams
Google map - National Division West teams
Google map - Federal Leagues teams

Rugby league in France
Sports league systems